W. Godfrey Wood (born 1941, in Brookline, Massachusetts) is an American entrepreneur and sports executive. The son of Wimbledon champion Sidney Wood, Wood studied at Milton Academy and later Harvard University, where he graduated in 1963 and played for the Crimson hockey team. Wood started the Hartford Whalers and the Portland Pirates hockey teams.

Businesses
Wood built his career as a real estate broker for Boston-based firm Land-Vest, and owns six restaurants in southern Maine. He served for 15 years as president and CEO of the Portland Regional Chamber of Commerce.

Hockey career
Wood still holds the collegiate season record for lowest goals against average (1.27 GAA, in 1962), as a goalie for Harvard's hockey team. His save percentage of .945 ranks second in all-time NCAA standings (only .001 behind .946). He was the last player cut from the United States team that would play the 1964 Winter Olympics.

In 1971, Wood was one of the founding partners of a World Hockey Association franchise based in New England, along with Howard Baldwin, John Colburn, and William Barnes. Originally known as New England Whalers upon its inception in 1972, the franchise would later be renamed Hartford Whalers when joining the National Hockey League in 1979.

Wood was part of a group that bid for the NHL's Boston Bruins in 1985, and in 1990 served as front man for future Boston Red Sox owner John W. Henry’s unsuccessful Miami expansion bid in the NHL (where the league instead awarded a franchise to Tampa). Wood owned the Nashville Knights of the East Coast Hockey League for several years in the early 1990s.  In 1993 he partnered with Tom Ebright, owner of the American Hockey League’s Baltimore Skipjacks, to move that franchise to Portland, Maine’s Cumberland County Civic Center, and served for three years as general manager to the Portland Pirates. In 1995, Wood created the Roller Hockey InternationalNew England Stingers, who lasted only one season.

He was president of Penguins Attractions, a sports merchandising and holding company in Falmouth, Massachusetts that was affiliated with the Pittsburgh Penguins.

Family
Wood's father Sidney won the 1931 Wimbledon Championships, and was later president of a gold mine concern in New York, while his stepfather retired as president of the National Association of Independent Schools in Boston. He has been married three times: to Kate Pillsbury (whose family then owned the Pillsbury Company), with whom he had daughter  Whitney and divorced in 1974; to Deborah Chapin Gray (d. 2005) mother of his children Sidney and Amanda; and since 2008 to Karen Rajotte, publisher of the Portland Phoenix.

References

1941 births
Businesspeople from Maine
Businesspeople from Massachusetts
Living people
Hartford Whalers executives
Harvard Crimson men's ice hockey players
Harvard University alumni
Ice hockey people from Massachusetts
Sportspeople from Brookline, Massachusetts
Milton Academy alumni
American chief executives
Ice hockey players from Massachusetts